Marvin Bam (born 12 September 1977) is a South African field hockey player who competed in the 2008 Summer Olympics.

References

External links

1977 births
Living people
South African male field hockey players
Olympic field hockey players of South Africa
2002 Men's Hockey World Cup players
2006 Men's Hockey World Cup players
Field hockey players at the 2008 Summer Olympics
Field hockey players at the 2002 Commonwealth Games
Commonwealth Games competitors for South Africa